Jones County, Alabama may refer to two former counties in the US state of Alabama:
 Covington County, Alabama.  Renamed Jones County on August 6, 1868, the original name of Covington was restored two months later on October 10, 1868.
 Lamar County, Alabama.  Established as Jones County on February 4, 1867, re-established as Sanford County on October 8, 1868, and renamed Lamar County on February 8, 1877.